Tarmo Kruusimäe (born 9 April 1967 in Tallinn) is an Estonian politician and musician. He has been member of XIII and XIV Riigikogu.

In 2009, he graduated from Tallinn University of Technology in international relations.

He has been a singer for several bands, eg Vanemõde, Tugev Tuul, Kulo. His stage name is Kojamees.

Since 1992, he is a member of party Isamaa.

References

Living people
1967 births
20th-century Estonian male singers
Estonian rock singers
Isamaa politicians
Members of the Riigikogu, 2015–2019
Members of the Riigikogu, 2019–2023
Tallinn University of Technology alumni
21st-century Estonian politicians
21st-century Estonian male singers
Singers from Tallinn
Politicians from Tallinn